Omo Baba Olowo (Yoruba: Son of a Rich Man) is the debut studio album by Nigerian singer Davido. It was released by HKN Music on July 17, 2012. The album was produced by Jay Sleek, Maleek Berry, GospelOnDeBeatz, Spellz, Dokta Frabz, Mr. Chidoo, Theory Soundz and Shizzi. Its release was preceded by four singles: "Back When", "Dami Duro", "Ekuro" and "Overseas". The album's music is a mixture of Afrobeats and hip hop. It features guest appearances from Naeto C, Sina Rambo, B-Red, Kayswitch, Ice Prince and 2 Face Idibia. Omo Baba Olowo received generally negative reviews from music critics, who denounced its lyrical content and Davido's songwriting. The album won Best R&B/Pop Album and received a nomination for Album of the Year at The Headies 2013. It was also nominated for Best Album of the Year at the 2013 Nigeria Entertainment Awards.

Launch concert
On July 22, 2012, the album's launch concert was held at the Expo Hall of the Eko Hotel and Suites in Victoria Island, Lagos. Davido's father Adedeji Adeleke and Aliko Dangote attended the event. Other celebrities in attendance included D'banj, Ikechukwu, Naeto C, Toke Makinwa, Munachi, Sasha, Daddy Freeze, Adaure Achumba, Mo'Cheddah, DJ Xclusive, May D, Dayo Ephraim and Funke Akindele.

Composition
The album opens with "All of You", a song with a mid tempo beat. In "Dollars in the Bank", Davido addresses gold diggers who are out for his wealth. In "Video", he lures a female fan into shooting an adult film with him. "Mary Jane" has two different connotations. From the surface, the song is about a "bad girl" that makes Davido's head swell while in a deeper meaning, it is an ode to marijuana. In the drum-infused "Gbon Gbon", producer Shizzi reproduces the sound of "Dami Duro". "No Visa" is a fusion of Europop and Azonto. "All of You" reveals a conceited Davido who sees himself as a victim of unjust castigation. "Feel Alright" is a song about the wax and wane of a relationship. The Maleek Berry-produced "New Skul Tinz" has an imperceptible dancehall feel to it. In "Enter the Center", Davido is reminiscent of Terry G.

Singles
The Naeto C-assisted track "Back When" was released on May 7, 2011, as the album's lead single. The song was recorded on Old Kent Road in London. The music video for "Back When" was shot and directed in Nigeria by Clarence Peters. It was uploaded to YouTube on May 9, 2011, at a total length of 3 minutes and 48 seconds. The album's second single "Dami Duro" was released on October 30, 2011, during the Occupy Nigeria protests. Davido told Adeola Adeyemo of BellaNaija he was skeptical when he dropped the song. The music video for "Dami Duro" was shot and directed in Lagos by Clarence Peters.

The album's third single "Ekuro" was released on January 25, 2012. Nigerian singer Aramide released a soulful rendition of the song. The accompanying music video for "Ekuro" was shot and directed in Miami by Antwan Smith. "Overseas" was released as the album's fourth single on May 6, 2012. It features vocals by Sina Rambo and was produced by Shizzi. An unfinished version of the song, titled "Take You Round The World", was released a week prior to the official release. The music video for "Overseas" was also shot and directed in Miami by Antwan Smith.

The album's fifth single "All of You" was released on September 28, 2012. The song was produced by GospelOnDeBeatz and was rumored to be a beef track. Its music video was shot and directed in Brooklyn, New York by Sesan Ogunro. The Shizzi-produced track "Gbon Gbon" was released on October 17, 2012, as the album's sixth single. The accompanying music video for "Gbon Gbon" was shot and directed in Lagos by Clarence Peters. The Ice Prince-assisted track "Feel Alright" was released on December 8, 2012, as the album's seventh single. The song was produced by Dokta Frabz. Aje Filmworks shot and directed the music video in Lagos.

Critical reception

Omo Baba Olowo received generally negative reviews from music critics. Ayomide Tayo of Nigerian Entertainment Today awarded the album 3.5 stars out of 5, criticizing its producers for "failing to cover up Davido's failings as an artiste". Tayo also opined that Davido's "songwriting skills could be better and his voice could be better groomed." Tobi Amoo of Hip Hop World Magazine gave the album 1 star out of 5, extensively stating: "David's debut album fails to strike that balance; not only does it not have enough hits to leave any impression as to his talents as a recording artiste, it possesses too many songs of the same mediocre quality, leading you to wonder if there will be a follow up attempt or if indeed there need be."

Ore Fakorede of YNaija criticized Davido's songwriting and singing voice. Wilfred Okiche said a "trip back to the drawing board should save his career the horror of another record like this." Toni Kan of Africa Magic praised the album's production, but ended the review saying it "sounds very familiar in places, leaving you with a heavy feeling of deja vu."

Accolades
Despite the negative reviews, the album won Best R&B/Pop Album and was nominated for Album of the Year at The Headies 2013. It was also nominated for Best Album of the Year at the 2013 Nigeria Entertainment Awards.

Track listing

Personnel
Credits adapted from the back cover of Omo Baba Olowo.

 David "Davido" Adeleke – primary artist, writer, executive producer, mastering
 Adewale Adeleke –  executive producer
 Dr. Adedeji Adeleke – executive producer
 Asa Askia – co-executive producer
 Sharon Adeleke – co-executive producer
 Kamal Ajiboye – co-executive producer
 Shizzi – producer, mastering
 Jerry "Jay Sleek" Shelika – producer
 Maleek Berry – producer
 Gospel "OnDeBeatz" Obi – producer
 Mr. Chidoo – producer
 Spellz – producer
 Dokta Frabz – producer
 Theory Soundz – producer, mixing, mastering
 Naetochukwu Chikwe – featured artist, writer
 Kehinde Oladotun Oyebanjo – featured artist
 Shina "Rambo" Adeleke – featured artist, writer
 Bayo "B-Red" Adeleke – featured artist, producer, writer
 Panshak Zamani – featured artist, writer
 Innocent Ujah Idibia – featured artist, writer
 TCD Photography – cover art photography

Release history

References

2012 debut albums
Davido albums
Yoruba-language albums
Albums produced by Shizzi
Albums produced by Spellz
Albums produced by Maleek Berry
Albums produced by GospelOnDeBeatz
Albums produced by Mr Chidoo
Albums produced by Dokta Frabz
Albums produced by Jay Sleek
2012 in Nigerian music